is a railway station in the city of Tagajō, Miyagi, Japan, operated by East Japan Railway Company (JR East).

Lines
Rikuzen-Sannō Station is served by the Tōhoku Main Line, and is located 362.2 kilometers from the official starting point of the line at Tokyo Station. It is also a terminal for the freight-only Sendai Rinkai Railway. Trains of the Senseki-Tohoku Line also stop at the station.

Station layout
The station has one side platform and one island platform connected to the station building by a footbridge. The station is unattended.

Platforms

History
It was renamed Rikuzen-Sannō Station on May 1, 1944. The station was absorbed into the JR East network upon the privatization of the Japanese National Railways (JNR) on April 1, 1987.

Surrounding area
 Tagajō City Library Sannō branch

See also
 List of railway stations in Japan

External links

 JR East station information 

Stations of East Japan Railway Company
Railway stations in Miyagi Prefecture
Tōhoku Main Line
Railway stations in Japan opened in 1933
Tagajō, Miyagi